The 1981–82 Northeastern Huskies men's basketball team represented Northeastern University during the 1981–82 college basketball season. Led by head coach Jim Calhoun, the Huskies competed in the ECAC North Conference and played their home games at Matthews Arena. They finished the season 23–7 overall with an 8–1 mark in ECAC North play to win the regular season conference title. They followed the regular season by winning the ECAC North Conference tournament to earn a bid to the NCAA tournament as No. 11 seed in the East region. After upsetting Saint Joseph's in the opening round, the Huskies were defeated in the second round by Villanova, 76–72 in 3OT.

Roster

Schedule and results

|-
!colspan=9 style=| Regular season

|-
!colspan=9 style=| ECAC North tournament

|-
!colspan=9 style=| NCAA Tournament

Awards and honors
 Perry Moss  ECAC North Player of the Year

References

Northeastern Huskies men's basketball seasons
Northeastern
Northeastern